Christopher Walken (born March 31, 1943) is an American actor of stage and screen. He has appeared in more than 100 movies and television shows, including Annie Hall, The Deer Hunter, Sleepy Hollow, Brainstorm, The Dead Zone, A View to a Kill, At Close Range, King of New York, Batman Returns, True Romance, Catch Me If You Can, Wayne's World 2, Pulp Fiction, and Wedding Crashers, as well as music videos by recording artists such as Madonna and Fatboy Slim.

Walken's films have grossed more than $1.8 billion in the United States, and he has received numerous awards for his performances and work. These include an Academy Award and a Golden Globe Award for The Deer Hunter, an Oscar nomination and wins for a BAFTA Award and a Screen Actors Guild Award for Catch Me If You Can, and two Primetime Emmy Award nominations for Sarah, Plain and Tall and Severance. Walken has also received several accolades for his work in the theatre, including two Tony Award nominations.

Major association

Academy Awards

British Academy Film Awards

Golden Globe Awards

Primetime Emmy Awards

Screen Actors Guild Awards

Tony Awards

Minor associations

AARP Movies for Grownups Awards

American Comedy Awards

Clarence Derwent Awards

Critics' Choice Movie Awards

Drama Desk Awards

Fangoria Chainsaw Awards

Golden Raspberry Awards

Hollywood Film Awards

Jeff Awards

Montreal World Film Festival Awards

MTV Movie & TV Awards

MTV Video Music Awards

Obie Awards

Outer Critics Circle Awards

Palm Springs International Film Festival Awards

Satellite Awards

Saturn Awards

Stinkers Bad Movie Awards

Theatre World Awards

Critics associations

Other honors

Notes

 I Shared with Nikki Blonsky, John Travolta, Michelle Pfeiffer, Queen Latifah, Amanda Bynes, James Marsden, Brittany Snow, Zac Efron, Elijah Kelley, and Allison Janney.
 II Shared with Patricia Arquette, Michael Chernus, Zach Cherry, Michael Cumpsty, Dichen Lachman, Britt Lower, Adam Scott, Tramell Tillman, Jen Tullock, and John Turturro.
 III Shared with John Travolta.
 IV Tied with Fan Wei for The Parking Attendant in July.
 V Shared with Michael Rooney and Spike Jonze.
 VI Shared with Colin Farrell, Sam Rockwell, Abbie Cornish, Linda Bright Clay, Kevin Corrigan, Woody Harrelson, Željko Ivanek, Long Nguyen, Christine Marzano, Tom Waits, Brendan Sexton III, Olga Kurylenko, Bonny, Gabourey Sidibe, Michael Pitt, Michael Stuhlbarg, and Harry Dean Stanton.

See also
Christopher Walken filmography

References

External links
 

Walken, Christopher